(born May 18, 1983) is a Japanese Kabuki, theatre, TV, and film actor. He was born , the second son of famed Kabuki performer, Nakamura Kanzaburō XVIII. Unlike many kabuki actors, who specialize in a single type of role, Shichinosuke plays both male (tachiyaku) and female (onnagata) parts.

Name and Lineage
Nakamura, often represented as "Shichinosuke Nakamura" in reference to his American film career, is a member of the kabuki guild Nakamura-ya, and currently performs kabuki along with his brother Nakamura Kantarō II. His family can trace their lineage back, within the kabuki world, at least seven generations, to Onoe Kikugorō III and Ichimura Uzaemon XI, who performed in the early 19th century. As is the case with the names of all kabuki actors, "Nakamura Shichinosuke" is a yagō or stage name.

Life and career
In September 1986 he made his first appearance on stage at the Kabuki-za, taking the name Nakamura Shichinosuke the following year. Within a few years he was described as "one of the 21st Century's most promising young Kabuki Actors". He has performed Kabuki in numerous international theaters, often alongside his father and brother, as part of the Heisei Nakamura-za. He also performs annually in Asakusa Kabuki at the Asakusa Kōkaidō, a production aimed at attracting the younger generation and encouraging in them an interest in kabuki.

In 1994, Shichinosuke performed in the modern play "Sukapan". He has also appeared in such NHK (Japan Broadcasting Corporation) TV drama series as Takeda Shingen (a dramatization of Shingen's life), and Genroku Ryoran.

Nakamura graduated from high school in March 2002 and the following year he played the role of Emperor Meiji in Edward Zwick's movie The Last Samurai. The Last Samurai marks his film debut.  In 2004 he appeared in the film version of Wataya Risa's novel Insutooru, and in 2005, he played an Edo period recovering drug addict in the absurdly comical film Mayonaka no Yaji-san Kita-san, based on a comic book.

Nakamura was arrested in January 2005 in Tokyo's Bunkyō-ku for punching a police officer after a taxi driver claimed he did not pay his fare while intoxicated in what could be the first arrest of a kabuki actor since the arrest of Ichikawa Gonjūrō for a murder charge in 1871. The subsequent controversy after the arrest barred Nakamura from participating in the celebration of his father's shūmei (naming ceremony) in March 2005.

Filmography
Film
 The Last Samurai (2003) - Emperor Meiji
 Install (2004) - Kouichi
 Mayonaka no Yaji-san Kita-san (2005) - Kitahachi
 Shinema kabuki: Renjishi (2008)
 The Tale of the Princess Kaguya (2013) - Mikado (voice)

Television
 Takeda Shingen (1988) - young Takeda Yoshinobu
 Idaten (2019) - Sanyūtei Enshō VI
 Nakamura Nakazo: Shusse no Kizahashi (2021)
 Taiga Drama ga Umareta Hi (2023) - Keiji Sada

Notes

See also
 Nakamura Kanzaburō

References
 Nakamura Shichinosuke II at Kabuki21.com
 Kabuki techō: Kabuki Official Data Book 2008. Nihon Haiyū Kyōkai (Japan Actors' Association). 2008: Tokyo. p155.

External links
 
 Nakamura-ya webpage (Japanese)

1983 births
Living people
Kabuki actors
People from Tokyo